Weet-Bix cards were series of collectors' cards issued in cereal boxes by the Sanitarium Health and Wellbeing Company in Australia and New Zealand.

Sanitarium started the Weet-Bix cards in 1942 in Australia to market their Weet-Bix cereal.  The company later expanded the cards to its Granose, Bixies, Cerix and later Puffed Wheat, Puffed Rice, Weeta Puffs, Weeta Flakes and Corn Flakes brands. 

In 1972, Sanitarium released a different series of Weet-Bix cards in their New Zealand products.  These cards were sometimes similar to the Australian series. but frequently had a New Zealand focus.

Sanitarium discontinued the Australian cards in 2012.

Australian cards 
The following is a list of Australian card releases.

New Zealand cards 
The following is a list of New Zealand card releases.

References

Seventh-day Adventist Church
Trading cards